Achiras or bizcochos de achira are traditional Colombian biscuits. They are made from achira flour (native to the region) instead of wheat flour. Widely recognized in Huila as the achiras del Huila or bizcochos de achira, they provide minerals such as calcium, iron, phosphorus, sodium and high protein content and are gluten-free. Its shape is elongated and cylindrical with a golden yellow colour, typical of good cooking. It melts slightly in your mouth with a crispy, soft and gritty texture, with a taste of milk.The achira is also known as saga or chisgua in Colombia. They are consumed as food by the Chibchas in Colombia, but it is thought that their use has extended throughout the Andes due to commercial exchanges with other indigenous communities.

Preparation 
Huila is the biggest producer of achira flour cake in the world. Achira biscuits are still prepared to a traditional recipe and cooked in clay ovens. Achira flour, the main ingredient, is subtracted from the achira plant, whose origin is South American and has been used by the Chibchas for their food.

Ingredients 

 1 pound of achira flour
 2 egg yolks
 1 pound butter, melted
 2 pounds of fresh curd

Preparation 

 Mix the achira flour with the well-ground cheese, regular sugar and salt.
 Form a crown and add the margarine, eggs, part of the milk and colour.
 Begin to soak until you get a smooth paste. Blend well and let it rest a little.
 Form bars of the desired thickness and cut the unit, the biscuits are made about five cm long and one and a half cm wide working with your hands.
 Place it on a greased tray in the oven preheated to 400 ° for 10 minutes.

Characteristics and qualities 

 External appearance: Oval shape, with variable dimensions, between 3 and 8 centimetres long and a diameter between 1 and 2 centimetres.
 Surface: Sandy.
 Colour: Golden yellow, without artificial colouring.
 Aroma: With a mild dairy aroma
 Texture: Crunchy (light toasted), gritty and melts gently on the palate.
 Weight: It ranges between 2.6 a. 8 grams according to the portion of dough put on the tray
 Internal appearance: Sandy compact, if possible without voids between its walls.

Reputation 
The achira biscuit is a fundamental part of the region's traditional culture, and due to its great recognition as a typical product of the department of Huila and its high local consumption, it has managed to diversify nationally and internationally.

Press articles highlight the presence of the achira biscuit in the national and international market. For example, the article "The Achira Biscuit opens export markets" mentions that one of the delicacies of the gastronomic department of Huila, the traditional achira biscuit, began to open markets in the United States and Spain and recently was second in a large project in Japan. The article highlights that the traditional achira biscuit is made by hand and that last year it managed to sell 114 thousand dollars abroad."

References 

Biscuits
Colombian cuisine